Wake Up Jeff! is the sixth album by Australian band the Wiggles, released in 1996 by ABC Music distributed by EMI. It won the ARIA Award for Best Children's Album in 1996.

Track list

AUS track list

US track list

Personnel
Source: Wake Up Jeff album booklet, 1996

The Wiggles
 Greg Page – lead vocals, back-up vocals
 Murray Cook – back-up vocals, garage band guitar, bass guitar
 Anthony Field – back-up vocals, garage band guitar, tin whistle
 Jeff Fatt – back-up vocals, accordion, piano, kazeeo organ,  snoring

Additional musicians
 Paul Paddick – back-up vocals
 Greg Truman – back-up vocals
 Emma Buter – back-up vocals
 Terry Murray – brilliant guitar
 Dominic Lindsay – trumpet, flugelhorn, and piccolo trumpet
 Angela Lindsay – viola
 Margaret Lindsay – cello
 Maria Schattovits – violin
 Tony Henry – drums
 Paul Rodgers – congas

Staff
 Engineered by Chris Brooke and Aaron Rhuig

Video

The companion video was released in August 1996 as the group's fourth video.

Summary

Song list
 We Like to Say Hello
 Henry's Underwater Big Band
 Everybody is Clever (Australian version) / The Chase (US version)
 Having Fun at the Beach
 Bing Bang Bong, That's a Pirate Song
 Bucket of Dew/Paddy Condon from Cobar
 Wake Up Jeff!
 Dorothy, Would You Like to Dance?
 Take a Trip Out on the Sea
 Romp Bomp a Stomp
 I Can Do So Many Things
 Wave to Wags
 Pipers Waltz
 Can You Point Your Fingers and Do the Twist? - concert
 D.O.R.O.T.H.Y. (My Favourite Dinosaur) – concert

Synopsis
Opening – An alarm clock rings and Jeff wakes up.

The Wiggles introduce themselves to the audience.
 Song: "We Like To Say Hello"

Greg is standing with Henry the Octopus and tells Greg that he has a surprise for everyone. Henry says that he bought his underwater big band with him.
 Song: "Henry's Underwater Big Band"

Greg tells everyone to stand still like a statue. The other Wiggles pose and then dance around behind Greg's back.
 Song: "Everybody Is Clever"  (Australian Version)  /  "The Chase" (North America Version)
Anthony and Murray watch kids draw scenes of the beach using pens and markers.
 Song: "Having Fun at the Beach"

The Wiggles introduce Captain Feathersword, but he answers with "Bing Bang Bong" and other nonsense phrases. They ask him what's up with that? He answers, that's a pirate song. Let's dance a pirate song together!
 Song: "Bing Bang Bong (That's A Pirate Song)"

Anthony and Murray introduce Dominic, who is with his daughter Ashleigh. He is a trumpet player. Anthony and Murray ask him questions about playing the trumpet and Dominic plays a little bit. Everyone's wearing a green hat, so it is time for some Irish Dancing.
 Song: "Bucket of Dew / Paddy Condon From Cobar"

The clock goes pass ticking and everybody yells WAKE UP JEFF! to wake Jeff up. And Jeff wakes up to the camera.
 Song: "Wake Up Jeff!"

Jeff asks Dorothy to dance, and Dorothy does a few dance steps.
 Song: "Dorothy (Would You Like To Dance?)"

The Wiggles and kids are in a camp site singing about going for a boat out in sea.
 Song: "Take A Trip Out on the Sea"

This is Dorothy's favourite dance.
 Song: "Romp Bomp A Stomp"

Greg and kids are doing this dance and Greg does tells them things that he can do in this song.
 Song: "I Can Do So Many Things"

Anthony can hear someone barking. He asked who's that barking and Greg yelled out IT'S WAGS THE DOG!
 Song: "Wave To Wags"
 Greg's Magic Show – The Magic Box

Greg, Anthony, and Murray are standing with an empty glass box. They can hear some one snoring and they are saying its coming from inside the box, but no one is inside the box or could they. Greg has Anthony and Murray cover the box with a drape, they spin it around, and chants some magic words when they count to three. 1, 2, 3, "Wiggle Waggle". They lift the drape and Jeff is there, but he's asleep. They ask everyone to wake him up. 1, 2, 3, WAKE UP JEFF! and then Jeff wakes up, wondering what he's doing in a box.

Murray tells Jeff to not fall asleep again and said we neeeeeeed YOU! for the next song.
 Song: "Pipers Waltz"

It's time to say goodbye. Jeff has fallen asleep again in his bed, so the Wiggles have one more dance. And then, yells the final "WAKE UP JEFF!" after they clap their hands three times.

The Wiggles are backstage. They have warmed up their singing voices by practicing "Rock-a-Bye Your Bear". They also have tucked their shirts and brushed their hair. Over by the side is Wags and Henry, Wags is polishing Henry's shoes. And at the last part, Greg knew that somebody was missing. Where's Jeff? Murray saw Jeff fallen asleep on a chair and told the Wiggles that he's asleep. They call the viewer to Wake up Jeff. 1, 2, 3, WAKE UP JEFF! Jeff arises and they're ready to go on stage for the concert and so they all ran out to the stage.
 Song: "Can You Point Your Fingers And Do The Twist? (Live)
 Song: "D.O.R.O.T.H.Y. (My Favourite Dinosaur) (Live)

Cast
The Wiggles are:
 Greg Page
 Anthony Field
 Murray Cook
 Jeff Fatt

Also featuring:
 Megan Bullivant & Emma Buter as Dorothy the Dinosaur
 Leeanne Ashley as Henry the Octopus
 Paul Paddick, Georgia Troy Barnes and Donna Halloran as Wags the Dog
 Paul Paddick as Captain Feathersword
 Dominic Lindsay as a trumpet player

Production
Anthony began wearing a blue shirt instead of a green shirt. Dorothy and Henry's costumes were updated but Dorothy's old costume is seen on "D.O.R.O.T.H.Y. (My Favourite Dinosaur)" while Henry's old one is seen on the cover. Anthony, Murray, and Greg wear short-sleeved shirts in the concert.

Paul Paddick, who joined the cast as a regular in 1996, makes his video debut as Captain Feathersword.

Tony Henry, who is a bandmate of Anthony and Jeff from The Cockroaches and the studio drummer for the Wake Up Jeff album, appears with his family in "We Like to Say Hello" and "Wave to Wags". John Field from The Cockroaches also appears in an outdoor shot for "Wave to Wags".

Release
The video was released on VHS in August 1996.

In April 2000, when the video was released in North America, "Everybody is Clever" was replaced by one of "The Chase" scenes typical of the closing credits of TV Series 1. However, the preceding skit where they act like statues was retained.

In August–September 2018, the video was uploaded to the Wiggles' YouTube channel in multiple parts.

It's Time to Wake Up Jeff!

It's Time to Wake Up Jeff! is the 23rd album release from an Australian children's music group, the Wiggles. It contains songs that were originally released on Wake Up Jeff!. In North America, the album and companion video were called Wiggle Around the Clock.

Track list
 We Like To Say Hello – 1:54
 Henry's Underwater Big Band – 2:27
 Intro – 0:07
 Having Fun at the Beach – 1:42
 Intro – 0:15
 Bing Bang Bong (That's A Pirate Song) – 1:17
 Bucket of Dew/ Paddy Condon From Cobar – 1:40
 Guess What – 1:41
 Wake Up Jeff – 1:22
 A Frog Went A Walking – 1:25
 Dorothy (Would You Like To Dance With Me?) – 1:49
 Take A Trip Out on the Sea – 1:05
 Romp Bomp A Stomp – 1:24
 We’re Playing A Trick on the Captain – 0:50
 Have A Happy Birthday Captain – 1:51
 I Can Do So Many Things – 1:31
 Wave To Wags – 1:38
 Havenu Shalom Alachem – 1:08
 House on the Hillside – 1:56
 Intro – 0:08
 Five Little Ducks – 1:12
 Windmills – 0:58
 Name Game – 1:01
 Pipers Waltz – 1:26
 Bonus Track – Go To Sleep Jeff (Brahm's Lullaby) – 4:33

2006 video

The companion video was released in 2006 as a DVD.

Song List
 We Like To Say Hello
 Henry's Underwater Big Band (animated)
 Having Fun at the Beach
 Bing Bang Bong (That's A Pirate Song)
 Wake Up Jeff!
 Bucket of Dew/Paddy Condon From Cobar
 Romp Bomp A Stomp
 A Frog Went a Walking (animated)
 Take A Trip Out on the Sea
 Dorothy (Would You Like To Dance?)
 We're Playing a Trick on the Captain
 Have a Happy Birthday Captain
 I Can Do So Many Things
 Guess What? (animated)
 Wave To Wags
 Havenu Shalom Alechem
 Walking on the Moon
 Piper's Waltz (Instrumental)

Notes

References

External links
 Wake Up Jeff (videorecording) at National Library of Australia
 
 

The Wiggles albums
The Wiggles videos
1996 albums
1996 video albums
2006 albums
2006 video albums
ARIA Award-winning albums
Australian children's musical films